Men and Noblemen is a 1959 Italian comedy film directed by Giorgio Bianchi and starring Vittorio De Sica.

Plot

Cast 
   
 Vittorio De Sica as Marquis  Nicola Peccoli Macinelli di Afragola
 Antonio Cifariello as Mario Ludovici 
 Silvia Pinal as  Giovanna 
 Mario Carotenuto as Commendator Sandrini 
 Raffaele Pisu as  Raffaele 
 Alberto Talegalli as  Frangipane 
 Elke Sommer as Caterina 
 Marco Tulli as  Guidobaldo 
 Maria Grazia Spina as Mario's seducer
  Francesca Benedetti as  Amalia Cavicchioni 
 Tiberio Murgia as Macrò
 Carlo Pisacane as  Beverello 
 Gustavo Serena as  Best man
  Bruno Smith  as Best man
 Dori Dorika as  Olga

References

External links

Italian comedy films
1959 comedy films
1959 films
Films directed by Giorgio Bianchi
1950s Italian films